Anubhav Singh Bassi is an Indian stand-up comedian. His career as a standup comic started after an open mic in 2017. Bassi's YouTube videos have got 200 million+ views and he has over 4 million subscribers along with 1.9 million+ followers on Instagram. He recently started his second Youtube channel be_a_bassi which has already gained over 500K subscribers. He has created twitter profile bas_kar_bassi in month of February 2023.

Along with this, he has done a monologue for Amazon Funnies. and a cameo in ZEE5's Comedy Couple (2020). He has done his show tour, Bas Kar Bassi, in more than 35 cities across India. He also delivered a Ted Talk with great panache about his struggles. Bassi was awarded 'Youth Icon of the Year' by Golden Glory Awards (2021).

In January 2023, Bassi announced his Bollywood debut with Luv Ranjan's Tu Jhoothi Main Makkaar alongside Ranbir Kapoor and Shraddha Kapoor which got released on 8th March 2023. He came up with his first standup special 'Bas Kar Bassi' on Amazon Prime Video in February 2023.

Early life and family
Anubhav Singh Bassi was born on 9 January 1991, in Meerut, Uttar Pradesh, India into a Hindu Jat family. He completed his schooling from Dewan Public School, where he was the head boy. He graduated with a BA LLB degree from Dr. Ram Manohar Lohiya National Law University, Lucknow in 2015. Bassi has also been an UPSC aspirant and an entrepreneur, before starting his career in stand-up comedy.

Films

 Comedy Couple (2020) as Himself (cameo) (ZEE5 film)
 Tu Jhoothi Main Makkaar (2023) as Manu Dabbas

Web series

 Bas Kar Bassi as Himself (standup comedy) (Amazon Prime Video)

References 

Indian stand-up comedians
Dr. Ram Manohar Lohia Avadh University alumni
Living people
1991 births